Enrique Salvador Chazarreta (29 July 1947 in Coronel Du Graty, Chaco – 24 March 2021) was an Argentine football midfielder who played for the Argentina national team.

Chazarreta was signed by San Lorenzo in the late 1960s. He was loaned to Argentinos Juniors in 1969 before returning to San Lorenzo in 1970. He was part of three championship winning squads in the 1970s. 

Chazarreta made his Argentina debut on 6 February 1973 in a game against Mexico. He was selected to play in the 1974 FIFA World Cup, where he made one appearance before Argentina were eliminated.

In 1975 Chazarreta moved to France, where he played for Avignon and then Olympique Alès.

In 1980, he returned to Argentina, where he played in the Argentine 2nd division for Gimnasia y Esgrima de La Plata and finally Deportivo Morón.

Honours

San Lorenzo
Argentine Primera: Metropolitano 1972, Nacional 1972, Nacional 1974

References

External links
 
 San Lorenzo profile 

1947 births
2021 deaths
Sportspeople from Chaco Province
Argentine footballers
Association football midfielders
Argentinos Juniors footballers
Argentine Primera División players
San Lorenzo de Almagro footballers
Ligue 1 players
Olympique Alès players
Club de Gimnasia y Esgrima La Plata footballers
Argentina international footballers
1974 FIFA World Cup players
Deportivo Morón footballers
Argentine expatriate footballers
Expatriate footballers in France
Argentine expatriate sportspeople in France
AC Avignonnais players